Heaven Sent Brandy is the world's smallest dog by length, measuring 15.2 cm (6 in), according to the Guinness Book of World Records.

Brandy was bred by Marlene and Matthew Ritzenthaler. Her sire was an AKC registered Chihuahua, Sevenbark Devil's Gold, a UKC Best in Show winner and AKC Champion producer. Her dam is Creel's Carmelita, a pointed AKC Chihuahua and AKC Champion producer. 
Heaven Sent Brandy faced a challenge from Tom Thumb, a Jack Russell terrier-Chihuahua mix puppy.

See also
 List of individual dogs

References

Individual dogs